James Macdonald was a Scottish professional footballer who played in the Scottish League for Heart of Midlothian as an inside right.

Personal life 
Macdonald served as a lance corporal in the Royal Scots during the First World War.

Career statistics

References 

Scottish footballers
Scottish Football League players
British Army personnel of World War I
Heart of Midlothian F.C. players
Year of birth missing
Year of death missing
Place of birth missing
Royal Scots soldiers
Association football inside forwards